Acrolister is a genus of beetles belonging to the family Histeridae.

Species:

Acrolister congoensis 
Acrolister garambae 
Acrolister kleinei

References

Histeridae